Li Yuan (1917 – December 18, 2008) was a People's Liberation Army major general who served as Chairman of the Hunan Province Revolutionary Committee during the Cultural Revolution.

History 
He was born in Xi County, Henan Province. He fought in the Battle of Shanghai in 1937.

In the Chinese Civil War, he participated in the Liaoshen Campaign and Pingjin Campaign.

During the Korean War, he was commander of the 140th Division of the People's Volunteer Army.

In 1967, he became Chairman of the Hunan Revolutionary Committee, succeeding former Kuomintang general Cheng Qian.

References 

1917 births
2008 deaths
People's Republic of China politicians from Henan
Chinese Communist Party politicians from Henan
People's Liberation Army generals from Henan
Governors of Hunan
Political office-holders in Hunan
Alternate members of the 9th Central Committee of the Chinese Communist Party
Members of the 6th Chinese People's Political Consultative Conference
Members of the 7th Chinese People's Political Consultative Conference